Alice of Old Vincennes, written by Maurice Thompson in 1900, is a novel set in Vincennes during the American Revolutionary War.

Reception
The book was a popular best-seller.  It was the tenth-highest best selling book in the United States in 1900, and the second best selling book in 1901 (bested only by The Crisis).  It was listed as the best-selling book in the United States in six consecutive monthly issues of The Bookman, from January through June 1901 (tied with Eben Holden for two of those months).

Notes

References

External links
 Alice of Old Vincennes at Project Gutenberg

1900 American novels
Novels by Maurice Thompson
Novels set in Indiana
Novels set during the American Revolutionary War